This list of museums in Maine is a list of museums, defined for this context as institutions (including nonprofit organizations, government entities, and private businesses) that collect and care for objects of cultural, artistic, scientific, or historical interest and make their collections or related exhibits available for public viewing. Non-profit and university art galleries are also included. Museums that exist only in cyberspace (i.e., virtual museums) are not included.

Museums

Defunct Museums
 Downeast Heritage Museum, Calais, closed in 2008
 Johnson Hall Museum, Wells, contents auctioned off in 2015, future uncertain
 Jones Museum of Glass and Ceramic, Sebago,
 Mainely Critters Wildlife Museum, Dixfield, destroyed in 2000 due to fire
 Museum of Lighthouse History, Wells, lighthouse collection relocated to the Maine Lighthouse Museum,
 Musical Wonder House, Wiscasset, closed in 2014
 Portland Harbor Museum, Portland, merged with the Maine Maritime Museum in June 2010
 Rier Sardine Museum, Lubec
 Shore Village Museum, Rockland, lighthouse collection relocated to the Maine Lighthouse Museum, 
 Webb Museum of Vintage Fashion, Island Falls
  Wells Auto Museum, Wells, closed in 2013

See also
 Botanical gardens in Maine (category)
 Nature Centers in Maine

References

External links
Maine Archives & Museums
Maine Art Scene - Maine Arts & Culture Online Magazine
Maine.gov: Museums
Maine Travel Guide

Museums
Maine
Museums